RV Caeli, also known as HD 28552, is a solitary, red hued variable star located in the southern constellation Caelum, the chisel. It has an apparent magnitude of 6.4, placing it near the limit for naked eye visibility.

Hipparcos has found it to vary between its photometric values of 6.44 and 6.56, which roughly corresponds with the magnitude as seen with the naked eye.  It was first suspected of variability in 1970, and a 1982 survey also identified suspected variations. However, it could not confirm it was a variable star.. It was confirmed as a variable star in 1999 on the basis of the Hipparcos photometry and given the variable star designation RV Caeli.

RV Caeli is an evolved red giant star with a stellar classification of M1 III. It is currently on the asymptotic giant branch, generating energy via hydrogen and helium shell fusion around an inert carbon core. It has 114% the mass of the Sun but has expanded to over 100 times its girth. RV Caeli is metal deficient, having an iron abundance 70% that of the Sun.

References

Caelum
Semiregular variable stars
028552
020856
M-type giants
Caeli, RV
1429
Durchmusterung objects